Adam Luke Springfield (born November 2, 1982) is an American actor. Springfield's most high-profile role was David Barnes in the PBS series Wishbone. Before landing the role of David Barnes in the PBS series Wishbone, Springfield had guest appearances on NBC's Seaquest DSV.

Career

Springfield's first screen role was playing the part of David Barnes in the PBS series Wishbone. He moved on to appear on Seaquest DSV.

One of Springfield's later roles was on the Mighty Morphin Power Rangers.

He currently works as a Program/Project Coordinator at Cedars-Sinai Medical Center in Los Angeles, California.

References

External links
 

1982 births
Living people
American male television actors
Male actors from Baltimore